The Holmfirth by-election was a Parliamentary by-election held on 20 June 1912. The constituency returned one Member of Parliament (MP) to the House of Commons of the United Kingdom, elected by the first past the post voting system.

Vacancy and electoral history
The local Liberal MP Henry Wilson resigned from parliament at the age of 79. He had been MP here since the seat was created in 1885. At the last General Election, he was returned unopposed. The last contested election was the previous election;

Candidates
The Liberal candidate selected was 34-year-old Sydney Arnold. He had contested neighbouring Holderness for the Liberals at the last election. He had been educated at Manchester Grammar School and had been a Member of Manchester Stock Exchange since 1904.
The Unionists re-selected 38-year-old Geoffrey Ellis from Shipley, West Yorkshire. Ellis was educated at Peterhouse, Cambridge. Since 1910 he worked for Beckett & Co., Bankers, of Leeds. Although he did not contest the December 1910 general election, he contested the previous General Election in January 1910.
The Labour Party selected 40-year-old William Lunn. He was educated at Rothwell Board School. He was a check-weighman who had started work in the pit at 12 years of age.

Campaign
Polling Day was set for 20 June 1912, just 15 days after the resignation of the previous MP. 
The constituency contained a mixture of mining, agriculture and textile industries. Arnold was a committed supporter of a Land value tax which he featured in his campaign. David Lloyd George the Liberal Chancellor of the Exchequer sent Arnold a public message in which he said Britain needed to "recast our present absurd land system."
Lunn was importantly backed by the Yorkshire Miners' Association which not only assured him of organised support but went some way to ensuring that much of the third of the electorate involved in mining, would support him at the ballot box.

Result

The percentage change in vote share is calculated from the last contested election in January 1910.

Aftermath
A general election was due to take place by the end of 1915. By the autumn of 1914, the following candidates had been adopted to contest that election. Due to the outbreak of war, the election never took place.

Arnold was elected for the re-drawn seat of Penistone in 1918.
Ellis was elected for the seat of Wakefield in 1922.
Lunn went on to be elected for Rothwell in 1918.

Smith was the endorsed candidate of the Coalition Government.

External links
 Who's Who: www.ukwhoswho.com
 By-Elections in British Politics, 1832-1914:https://books.google.com/books?id=fASYFMKoTRIC&pg=PA8&dq=By-Elections+in+British+Politics,+1832-1914&hl=en&sa=X&ei=0WsHUq7NM8GO7Qa0poHoBw&ved=0CDMQ6AEwAA#v=onepage&q&f=false

References

 Craig, F. W. S. (1974). British parliamentary election results 1885-1918 (1 ed.). London: Macmillan.
 Debrett's House of Commons 1916

By-elections to the Parliament of the United Kingdom in West Yorkshire constituencies
1912 in England
1912 elections in the United Kingdom
Elections in Kirklees
Holmfirth
1910s in Yorkshire